French Island, Maine may refer to:
 An island in Ellis Pond
 A neighborhood in Old Town, Maine